Vasantdada Patil became the Chief Minister of Maharashtra for the first time on 17 April 1977, replacing Shankarrao Chavan. The government continued until the 1978 legislative elections, after which Patil continued with his second ministry.

List of ministers
The ministry consisted of the following:

References

Indian National Congress
P
P
Cabinets established in 1977
Cabinets disestablished in 1978